Charmin Smith (born May 2, 1975) is an American basketball coach and former player who is the head coach of the California Golden Bears women's team.

Early life and collegiate career
Smith was born in St. Louis on May 2, 1975. Her brother, Charles, was her role model for basketball when she was growing up.

Upon graduating from Ladue Horton Watkins High School in St. Louis in 1993, Smith attended Stanford University, where she played four years for the Cardinal. A four-year letter winner, Smith helped Stanford win three consecutive Pac-10 championships and make three consecutive Final Four appearances in 1995, 1996, and 1997. Smith averaged 4.7 points, 3.4 rebounds, and 2.2 assists during her senior year.

Smith earned both her bachelor's and master's degrees in civil and environmental engineering at Stanford.

Professional career
After her years at Stanford, Smith played one year with the Portland Power of the ABL, the last year before the league folded.  She would be signed by the Minnesota Lynx for the 1999 WNBA season. In 2000 the Seattle Storm picked her up in the expansion draft, and she would play for the Storm for the 2000 and 2001 seasons. She would play one more season in the WNBA for the Phoenix Mercury in 2003. Smith went overseas in 2003 to play for the Swedish team Solna Vikings before retiring from the sport as a player.

During her off-seasons with the WNBA, Smith would work as a production assistant and editor with NBA Entertainment, as well as with the Seattle Storm CR office.

WNBA career statistics

Regular season

|-
| align="left" | 1999
| align="left" | Minnesota
| 13 || 0 || 4.3 || .111 || .000 || .800 || 0.7 || 0.2 || 0.1 || 0.0 || 0.4 || 0.8
|-
| align="left" | 2000
| align="left" | Seattle
| 32 || 3 || 16.1 || .286 || .313 || .56 || 1.5 || 1.7 || 0.5 || 0.1 || 1.0 || 1.6
|-
| align="left" | 2001
| align="left" | Seattle
| 32 || 8 || 18.4 || .270 || .289 || .619 || 1.7 || 1.2 || 0.5 || 0.0 || 0.8 || 1.8
|-
| align="left" | 2003
| align="left" | Phoenix
|4 || 0 || 4.3 || .000 || .000 || .000 || 1.0 || 0.3 || 0.0 || 0.0 || 0.0 || 0.0
|-
| align="left" | Career
| align="left" | 4 years, 3 teams
| 81 || 11 || 14.5 || .262 || .276 || .633 || 1.4 || 1.2 || 0.4 || 0.0 || 0.8 || 1.5

Coaching career

Boston College
Smith began her coaching career as an assistant under Cathy Inglese at Boston College in the 2003−04 season. The Eagles won their first Big East tournament championship, and were eliminated in the regional semifinals of the 2004 NCAA tournament.

Stanford
Smith was subsequently hired by Tara VanDerveer, under whom she played at Stanford, as an assistant for the Cardinal. In Smith's three years on VanDerveer's staff, the Cardinal went 87−16 overall, attaining a record of 49−5 in Pac-10 play, while winning two conference tournaments and making the Elite 8 twice.

California
Smith joined Joanne Boyle's coaching staff at California in 2007. The Golden Bears won the 2010 WNIT and made postseason appearances in all of Boyle's remaining years as coach.

Smith remained on the California staff when Lindsay Gottlieb was named head coach in 2011. For the 2012−13 season, Gottlieb promoted Smith to associate head coach, helping to lead a team with high expectations coming off a second round NCAA tournament appearance in 2011−12. That year, California went 32–4 (17–1 in the Pac-10) and made their first ever Final Four appearance.

New York Liberty
On April 2, 2019, Smith joined Katie Smith's staff with the New York Liberty as an assistant coach. She served in that capacity for roughly two and a half months.

Return to California as head coach
Following Lindsay Gottlieb's departure for the Cleveland Cavaliers nine days earlier, Smith returned to California on June 21, 2019, being announced as the 10th head coach in California Golden Bears history. She departed New York with Katie Smith's blessing.

Head coaching record

References

External links
WNBA Player Profile
Cal Official Site
This is Cal Basketball

1975 births
Living people
American expatriate basketball people in Sweden
American women's basketball coaches
American women's basketball players
Basketball coaches from Missouri
Basketball players from St. Louis
Boston College Eagles women's basketball coaches
California Golden Bears women's basketball coaches
Ladue Horton Watkins High School alumni
Minnesota Lynx players
Phoenix Mercury players
Portland Power players
Seattle Storm players
Solna Vikings players
Stanford Cardinal women's basketball coaches
Stanford Cardinal women's basketball players
Guards (basketball)